Jevrem Nenadović (27 September 1793–6 April 1867) was a Serbian politician, President of the Court in Valjevo, and State Counselor in Belgrade. As a young man he was appointed the vojvoda of Tamnava, protecting the border from Soko and from the Drina, during the First Serbian Uprising. He was a member of the Serbian Learned Society.

Jevrem Nenadović was born in Brankovina near Valjevo, at the time part of the Sanjak of Smederevo (Belgrade Pashaluk) into the notable Nenadović family. He was the son of Jakov Nenadović (1765–1836) and Nerandža, nephew of Aleksa Nenadović (1749–1804), and cousin of Mateja Nenadović (1777–1854). He married Jovanka "Joka" Milovanović, the daughter of Mladen Milovanović (1760–1823). His daughter Persida (1813–1873) married Alexander Karađorđević, Prince of Serbia (r. 1842–58)

Issue
Jevrem Nenadović married Jovanka "Joka" Milovanović, the daughter of Mladen Milovanović (1760–1823). They had five daughters and two sons:
Persida (1813–1873), married Alexander Karađorđević, Prince of Serbia (r. 1842–58)
Anka (1820–1843), married Milosav Topalović
Mašinka (1823–1898), married Jovan Lukačević
Mladen J. (1834–1868), married Sofija Barlovac
Simeon "Sima" (1838–1868)
Jelisaveta (?), married Jevrem Gavrilović
Bosiljka (?), married Radovan Đurić

See also
 List of Serbian Revolutionaries

References

Sources
  

1793 births
1867 deaths
19th-century Serbian people
Serbian revolutionaries
People of the First Serbian Uprising
Politicians from Valjevo
Members of the Serbian Learned Society
Serbian politicians
People from the Principality of Serbia